The 1977 Vanderbilt Commodores football team represented Vanderbilt University in the 1977 NCAA Division I football season. The Commodores were led by head coach Fred Pancoast in his third year. Vanderbilt had its second year with only two win both being non-conference games (2–9 overall, 0–6 in the SEC).

Schedule

References

Vanderbilt
Vanderbilt Commodores football seasons
Vanderbilt Commodores football